Impressions of the West Lake is an album by Japanese new age musician Kitarō, released in April 2009. It was nominated for Best New Age Album at the 52nd Annual Grammy Awards.

Track listing

Awards

Personnel
Kitaro - Producer, Composer, Arranger, Engineer, Mixing
Randy Miller - Arranger
Ian Ulibarri - Assistant Engineer
Steven Miller - Mixing
Doug Sax - Mastering
Jane Zhang - Vocals on the track, “Impressions Of The West Lake”
Additional Personnel
Eiichi Naito - Executive Producer, Management
Dino Malito - A&R, Management
Howard Sapper - Business & Legal Affairs
Joseph DeMeo - Marketing
Hitoshi Saito - Marketing 
Atsuko Mizuta - Marketing
Kio Griffith - Art Direction, Design

References

External links
Kitaro official site

2009 albums
Kitarō albums